The Paceship PY 26 is a Canadian sailboat that was designed by John Deknatel, president of C. Raymond Hunt Assoc. and first built in 1972.

In 1982, the PY 26 design was developed into the Tanzer 27, with a deck-stepped mast and different interior.

Production

The design was initially built by Paceship Yachts of Mahone Bay, Nova Scotia, Canada starting in 1974. Production was transferred to AMF Corporation in Connecticut, United States in 1977. In 1982 the hull molds were sold to Tanzer Industries and they produced a slightly longer model called the Tanzer 27. The design is now out of production, with 364 examples having been produced.

Design
The Paceship PY 26 is a recreational keelboat, built predominantly of fibreglass, with wood trim. It has a masthead sloop rig with a keel-stepped mast, a raked stem, a near-vertical transom, a transom-hung rudder controlled by a tiller and a fixed fin keel. There was also a stub keel/centreboard version produced. The fin keel model displaces  and carries  of iron ballast.

The boat can be fitted with either a small inboard motor or an outboard motor for docking and maneuvering.

Operational history
The boat was at one time supported by an active class club, The Paceship, but the club is currently inactive.

In a review Michael McGoldrick wrote, "The Paceship PY26 has to be described as a big 26 footer. Many manufacturers would have marketed this boat as a 27 footer, as did Tanzer. And with a displacement of 6000 pounds, this boat is reaching the upper limits of what can be realistically pushed around with an outboard motor. The PY was available with an optional inboard engine."

In a paceship.org review Jay Moran concluded, "the PY 26 is quite large for its length, but the boat still sails very well, even in light air with a 150% genoa. In heavy airs, the boat feels stable, secure and is usually remains fairly dry. The large tiller steered outboard rudder makes the boat very responsive and provides excellent helm feedback. In summary this is a well built, roomy, and beautiful looking, high performance sailboat".

In an owner review Tristan Nettles wrote, "all in all the PY26 is a strong and capable boat that needs 10 knots or more of breeze to really handle well. It is simple in its systems and capable of offshore passages. My biggest knock against the boat is its underpowered engine. The boat is very big and spacious for its size. A good starter boat.".

See also
List of sailing boat types

Similar sailboats
Beneteau First 26
Beneteau First 265
C&C 26
C&C 26 Wave
Contessa 26
Dawson 26
Discovery 7.9
Grampian 26
Herreshoff H-26
Hunter 26
Hunter 26.5
Hunter 260
Hunter 270
MacGregor 26
Mirage 26
Nash 26
Nonsuch 26
Outlaw 26
Pearson 26
Parker Dawson 26
Sandstream 26
Tanzer 26
Yamaha 26

References

External links

Keelboats
1970s sailboat type designs
Sailing yachts
Sailboat type designs by C. Raymond Hunt Associates
Sailboat types built by Paceship Yachts